In probability theory and statistics, the Bernoulli distribution, named after Swiss mathematician Jacob Bernoulli, is the discrete probability distribution of a random variable which takes the value 1 with probability  and the value 0 with probability . Less formally, it can be thought of as a model for the set of possible outcomes of any single experiment that asks a yes–no question. Such questions lead to outcomes that are boolean-valued: a single bit whose value is success/yes/true/one with probability p and failure/no/false/zero with probability q. It can be used to represent a (possibly biased) coin toss where 1 and 0 would represent "heads" and "tails", respectively, and p would be the probability of the coin landing on heads (or vice versa where 1 would represent tails and p would be the probability of tails).  In particular, unfair coins would have 

The Bernoulli distribution is a special case of the binomial distribution where a single trial is conducted (so n would be 1 for such a binomial distribution). It is also a special case of the two-point distribution, for which the possible outcomes need not be 0 and 1.

Properties

If  is a random variable with this distribution, then:

The probability mass function  of this distribution, over possible outcomes k, is

This can also be expressed as

or as

The Bernoulli distribution is a special case of the binomial distribution with 

The kurtosis goes to infinity for high and low values of  but for  the two-point distributions including the Bernoulli distribution have a lower excess kurtosis than any other probability distribution, namely −2.

The Bernoulli distributions for  form an exponential family.

The maximum likelihood estimator of  based on a random sample is the sample mean.

Mean 
The expected value of a Bernoulli random variable  is

Variance 
The variance of a Bernoulli distributed  is

We first find

From this follows

With this result it is easy to prove that, for any Bernoulli distribution, its variance will have a value inside .

Skewness 
When we take the standardized Bernoulli distributed random variable  we find that this random variable attains  with probability  and attains  with probability . Thus we get

Higher moments and cumulants

The central moment of order  is given by

The first six central moments are

The first six cumulants are

Related distributions
If  are independent, identically distributed  (i.i.d.)  random variables, all Bernoulli trials with success probability p, then their sum is distributed according to a binomial distribution with parameters n and p: 
 (binomial distribution).

The Bernoulli distribution is simply , also written as 

The categorical distribution is the generalization of the Bernoulli distribution for variables with any constant number of discrete values.
The Beta distribution is the conjugate prior of the Bernoulli distribution.
The geometric distribution models the number of independent and identical Bernoulli trials needed to get one success.
If , then  has a Rademacher distribution.

See also
Bernoulli process, a random process consisting of a sequence of independent Bernoulli trials
Bernoulli sampling
Binary entropy function
Binary decision diagram

References

Further reading

External links

.

 Interactive graphic: Univariate Distribution Relationships.

Discrete distributions
Conjugate prior distributions
Exponential family distributions